Erastus Fairbanks (October 28, 1792November 20, 1864) was an American manufacturer, Whig politician, a founder of the Republican Party, and the 21st and 26th governor of Vermont.

Biography
Fairbanks was born in Brimfield, Massachusetts, to Phebe (Paddock) Fairbanks (1760–1853) and Joseph Fairbanks (1763–1846). Ephraim Paddock, the brother of Phebe Paddock, was his uncle.  He studied law but abandoned it for mercantile pursuits, and operated a store in Wheelock, Vermont. He married Lois Crossman (1792–1866) on May 30, 1815.  The couple had nine children.

Career

Finally settling in St. Johnsbury, Vermont, in 1824, Fairbanks formed a partnership, E. & T. Fairbanks & Co., with his brother Thaddeus for the manufacture of scales, stoves and plows. Thaddeus Fairbanks later invented the first platform scale, which made it possible to calculate the weight of farm products and other goods shipped by wagon and railroad car; the device proved so successful that the renamed Fairbanks Scales company became the largest employer in the state.

The Fairbanks family was involved in numerous charitable and civic endeavors throughout St. Johnsbury and the surrounding towns, including the 1842 founding of St. Johnsbury Academy.

Fairbanks was a member of the Vermont House of Representatives from 1836 to 1840. He was a Whig Presidential Elector for Vermont in 1844 and 1848. He was President of the Passumpsic Railroad, which completed a line from White River to St. Johnsbury in 1850. Though he would ultimately withdraw from the venture due to disputes about labor and planning with the Boston Associates, Fairbanks and his company would be the first to fund the Hadley Falls Dam project in 1846. The project, conceived by one of his salesmen and personal associates, George C. Ewing, ultimately created Holyoke, Massachusetts.

Fairbanks was elected the 21st Governor of Vermont in 1852 and served until 1853. During this term, a law was passed forbidding the sale or traffic of intoxicating beverages.  The law was not repealed until 1902.

Fairbanks was one of the founders of the Republican Party, and a delegate from Vermont to the first Republican National Convention in 1856. He was 26th Governor of Vermont from 1860 to 1861. During his second term he rendered valuable aid in the equipment and dispatch of troops in the early days of the American Civil War.

Family life
With his brothers Thaddeus and Joseph P., he founded St. Johnsbury Academy. He was the father of Horace Fairbanks and Franklin Fairbanks.

Death
Fairbanks was a Congregationalist. He died in St. Johnsbury, Caledonia County, Vermont, on November 20, 1864 (age 72 years, 23 days). He is interred at Mt. Pleasant Cemetery, St. Johnsbury, Vermont.

References

Further reading
Fairbanks, Lorenzo Sayles, Genealogy of the Fairbanks Family in America 1633–1897, Boston, 1897.

External links

Ancestry.com
Fairbanks Museum in St. Johnsbury, Vermont
The Political Graveyard
National Governors Association

Fairbanks family papers at Vermont Historical Society

1792 births
1864 deaths
People from Brimfield, Massachusetts
People from St. Johnsbury, Vermont
Governors of Vermont
Members of the Vermont House of Representatives
People of Vermont in the American Civil War
Vermont Whigs
Vermont Republicans
Union (American Civil War) state governors
Whig Party state governors of the United States
19th-century American politicians
Republican Party governors of Vermont
19th-century American businesspeople